Otto's sportive lemur (Lepilemur otto), or the Ambodimahabibo sportive lemur, is a sportive lemur endemic to Madagascar.  Its coloration is primarily grey-brown.  It is known only from Ambodimahabibo, between the Mahajamba River in the west and the Sofia River in the north.

References

Sportive lemurs
Mammals described in 2007